Hello, Annapolis is a 1942 American film. Filming started January 1942.

Plot
Doris Henley (Jean Parker) attracts the attention of Bill Arden (Tom Brown) and Paul Herbert (Larry Parks).  Arden and Herbert sign up at Annapolis Naval Academy in order to impress the young lady.  Arden finds he dislikes the life of a naval man, until he saves his rival's (Herbert) life in a fire.  Arden is badly burned in the effort, but earns the respect of others, which makes him rethink his views.

Cast
 Tom Brown as Bill Arden
 Jean Parker as Doris Henley
 Larry Parks as Paul Herbert
 Phil Brown as Kansas City
 Joseph Crehan as Evans Arden
 Thurston Hall as Capt. Wendall
 Ferris Taylor as Capt. Forbes
 Herbert Rawlinson as Capt. Dugan
 Mae Busch as Miss Jenkins
 Robert Kellard as George Crandall (billed as Robert Stevens)
 Stanley Brown as Norman Brennan
 William Blees as Hazlett Houston
 Georgia Caine as Aunt Arabella

References

External links

1942 films
American comedy films
1942 comedy films
American black-and-white films
1940s English-language films
Films directed by Lew Landers
1940s American films